Eupithecia wilemani is a moth in the family Geometridae. It is found in Philippines (Luzon).

References

Moths described in 1931
wilemani
Moths of Asia